Khooni Murda  is a 1989 Bollywood horror film directed and produced by Mohan Bhakri and starring Deepak Parashar, Javed Khan and Sriprada. The movie is a low budget Indian version of A Nightmare on Elm Street (1984). Movie was graded adult (A) certificate because of nude scenes of lead actress Shagufta Ali. There was no body double used and Shagufta Ali has to shoot fully nude for one scene from behind. It was labelled B Grade horror movie. The movie was an average grosser of the year 1989. The music of the film is composed by Bappi Lahiri.

Plot
This is the revenge story of Ranjit and his girl friend Rekha who were killed by a group of college students. the dead man's soul revives as a vengeful spirit and begins to kill the college students one by one.

Cast 
 Deepak Parashar as Police Inspector Rakesh
 Javed Khan as Dev
 Shriprada as Rekha
 Puneet Issar as Johnny
 Rajesh Vivek as Tantric
 Kiran Kumar
 Shagufta Ali
 Meethee
 Kamna
 Amrit Raj
 Madhu Malhotra
 Jagdeep

Music
"Chaska Chaska" - Kavita Krishnamurthy
"Main Kurate Ka Butto Banke" - Jagdeep, Shagufta Ali

References

External links
 

1989 films
1980s Hindi-language films
1989 horror films
A Nightmare on Elm Street (franchise)
Films scored by Bappi Lahiri
Indian slasher films
Indian horror films
Indian horror film remakes
Indian remakes of American films
1980s slasher films
Hindi-language horror films